Combat mission may refer to:

 Military operation, the disciplined movement or decisions implemented by specific governments in order to implement strategic or foreign policies
 Combat Mission, the name of a successful series of computer games simulating tactical battles
 Combat Mission: Beyond Overlord, the first game in the Combat Mission series, 2000
 Combat Mission: Shock Force, 2007
 Combat Mission: Battle for Normandy, 2011
 Combat Missions, a 2002 American reality TV show